The 1990 Air Canada Cup was Canada's 12th annual national midget 'AAA' hockey championship, which was played April 18 – 22, 1990 at the Colisée Cardin in Sorel, Quebec.  The gold medal game was an all-Quebec showdown, as the Riverains du Richelieu defeated the Gouverneurs de Ste-Foy to become the second host team to win the national midget title.  The Notre Dame Hounds took the bronze medal.  Rene Corbet of Richelieu was named the tournament's Most Valuable Player.  Other future National Hockey League players competing in this tournament were Philippe Boucher, Michael Peca, Scott Fraser, and Pascal Rhéaume.

Teams

Round robin

Standings

Scores

Richelieu 5 - Toronto 2
Ste-Foy 4 - Fredericton 2
Notre Dame 5 - St. Albert 0
Richelieu 2 - Fredericton 0
Ste-Foy 5 - Toronto 2
Notre Dame 3 - Richelieu 1
Ste-Foy 6 - St. Albert 5
Toronto 6 - Fredericton 3
Richelieu 10 - St. Albert 2
Ste-Foy 4 - Notre Dame 1
St. Albert 8 - Toronto 5
Notre Dame 4 - Fredericton 2
Richelieu 3 - Ste. Foy 3
Toronto 2 - Notre Dame 2
St. Albert 5 - Fredericton 4

Playoffs

Semi-finals
Ste-Foy 2 - St. Albert 0
Richelieu 5 - Notre Dame 4 OT

Bronze-medal game
Notre Dame 5 - St. Albert 3

Gold-medal game
Richelieu 7 - Ste-Foy 2

Individual awards
Most Valuable Player: Rene Corbet (Richelieu)
Most Sportsmanlike Player: Normand Paquet (Ste-Foy)

See also
Telus Cup

References

External links
Telus Cup Website
Hockey Canada-Telus Cup Guide and Record Book

Telus Cup
Air Canada Cup
Sport in Sorel-Tracy
April 1990 sports events in Canada